Stylianos (Stelios) Constantas is a Greek Cypriot singer. He participated in two Cypriot national finals for the Eurovision Song Contest, coming second in 1997 with I grammitis ntropi, and fourth in 1999 with Methysmeno feggari. In 2003, he performed the song "Feeling Alive" as the Cypriot entry for the Eurovision Song Contest, finishing 20th in the competition. He has released one album and a single through V2 Records.

Constantas was born in Larnaca. In 2002, he moved to Greece with his wife and three children.

References

Year of birth missing (living people)
Living people
Eurovision Song Contest entrants for Cyprus
Eurovision Song Contest entrants of 2003
Cypriot composers
Male composers
20th-century Cypriot male singers
21st-century Cypriot male singers